Antipolo's 1st congressional district is one of the two congressional districts of the Philippines in the city of Antipolo and one of four in the province of Rizal. It has been represented in the House of Representatives of the Philippines since 2004. The district consists of the western Antipolo barangays of Bagong Nayon, Beverly Hills, De La Paz, Mambugan, Mayamot, Munting Dilao, San Isidro and Santa Cruz. It is currently represented in the 19th Congress by Roberto Puno of the National Unity Party (NUP).

Representation history

Election results

2022

2019

2016

2013

See also
Legislative districts of Antipolo

References

Congressional districts of the Philippines
Politics of Antipolo
2003 establishments in the Philippines
Congressional districts of Calabarzon
Constituencies established in 2003